Luke Robinson may refer to:

 Luke Robinson (died 1669)  (c 1610–1669), English MP for Scarborough  and Yorkshire between 1645 and 1660
 Luke Robinson (died 1773), English barrister and politician, MP for Hedon  1741–42 and 1747–54
 Luke Robinson (wrestler) (born 1985), American professional wrestler
 Luke Robinson (rugby league) (born 1984), English rugby league footballer
 Luke Robinson (Bermudan footballer) (born 1998), Bermudan footballer
 Luke Robinson (Scottish footballer) (born 2001), Scottish professional footballer

See also 
Robinson (name)